Pavel Pergl (14 November 1977 – 1 May 2018) was a Czech professional footballer who played as a central defender. He committed suicide on 1 May 2018.

Career
Pergl played for Sparta Prague, SG Dynamo Dresden (two spells), Preston North End, AEK Larnaca, Hapoel Be'er Sheva, AC Bellinzona, FC Vaduz.

References

External links
 
 
 

1977 births
2018 deaths
Czech footballers
Footballers from Prague
Association football defenders
AC Sparta Prague players
FK Chmel Blšany players
1. FK Příbram players
Preston North End F.C. players
AEK Larnaca FC players
Dynamo Dresden players
FK Drnovice players
AC Bellinzona players
FC Vaduz players
Hapoel Be'er Sheva F.C. players
Hapoel Ramat Gan F.C. players
FC Chur 97 players
Czech First League players
English Football League players
2. Bundesliga players
3. Liga players
Swiss Super League players
Swiss Challenge League players
Cypriot First Division players
Czech expatriate footballers
Czech expatriate sportspeople in Israel
Expatriate footballers in Israel
Czech expatriate sportspeople in Cyprus
Expatriate footballers in Cyprus
Czech expatriate sportspeople in Germany
Expatriate footballers in Germany
Czech expatriate sportspeople in Switzerland
Expatriate footballers in Switzerland
Czech expatriate sportspeople in England
Expatriate footballers in England
Czech expatriate sportspeople in Liechtenstein
Expatriate footballers in Liechtenstein
Suicides by hanging in Germany
2018 suicides